Mason Lamb (born February 8, 2001) is an American soccer player who plays as a defender for the Cal State Fullerton Titans.

Career 
A member of the Orlando City academy since 2015, Lamb made 116 appearances in five seasons across the club's multiple age groups, scoring five goals. While with the Orlando academy, Lamb also featured for USL League Two side SIMA Águilas in 2018, playing one regular season and one playoff match.

In March 2020, Lamb signed an academy contract with Orlando City B, Orlando City's USL League One affiliate, ahead of the 2020 season. He made his debut on August 23, 2020, starting and scoring in a 3–1 loss to Forward Madison.

References

External links 
 Mason Lamb Orlando City profile

2001 births
American soccer players
Association football forwards
Living people
SIMA Águilas players
Orlando City B players
Soccer players from Florida
USL League One players
USL League Two players
People from Groveland, Florida
Sportspeople from Lake County, Florida
People from Clermont, Florida
Rollins Tars men's soccer players
Cal State Fullerton Titans men's soccer players